Oretopsis is a genus of moths belonging to the subfamily Drepaninae. It contains the single species Oretopsis vohilava, described by Pierre Viette in 1954. It is found in Madagascar.

References

Drepaninae
Monotypic moth genera
Drepanidae genera